Samuel Randall may refer to:

 Samuel J. Randall (1828–1890), Pennsylvania politician, attorney and soldier
 Samuel C. Randall (1837–1909), Michigan politician